Jeanne Mammen (21 November 1890 – 22 April 1976) was a German painter and illustrator of the Weimar period. Her work is associated with the New Objectivity and Symbolism movements. She is best known for her depictions of strong, sensual women and Berlin city life.

Life and career
Jeanne Mammen was born in Berlin, the daughter of a successful German merchant. She and her family moved to Paris when she was five years old. She studied art in Paris, Brussels and Rome from 1906-1911. Her early work, influenced by Symbolism, Art Nouveau, and the Decadent movement, was exhibited in Brussels and Paris in 1912 and 1913.

In 1916 Mammen and her family fled Paris to avoid internment during World War I. While her parents moved to Amsterdam, Mammen chose instead to return to Berlin. She was now financially on her own for the first time, as the French government had confiscated all of her family's property. For several years Mammen struggled to make ends meet, taking any work she could find, and spending time with people from different class backgrounds. These experiences and newfound sympathies are reflected in her artwork from the period.

In time Mammen was able to find work as a commercial artist, producing fashion plates, movie posters, and caricatures for satirical journals such as Simplicissimus, Ulk, and Jugend. In the mid-1920s she became known for her illustrations evoking the urban atmosphere of Berlin. Much of her artwork depicted women. These women subjects often included haughty socialites, fashionable middle-class shop girls, street singers, and prostitutes. Her drawings were often compared to those of George Grosz and Otto Dix. Throughout the late 1920s and early 1930s she worked mainly in pencil with watercolor washes, and in pen and ink.

In 1921, Mammen moved into an apartment with her sister in Berlin. This apartment was a former photographer's studio which she lived in until her death. Aside from Art throughout her life Mammen also was interested in science. She was close friends with Max Delbrück who left Europe and took some of her artwork with him and exhibited them in California. In addition to bringing these art works to be exhibited he also sent Mammen care packages from the United States with art supplies.

In 1930 she had a major exhibition in the Fritz Gurlitt gallery. Over the next two years, at Gurlitt's suggestion, she created one of her most important works: a series of eight lithographs illustrating Les Chansons de Bilitis, a collection of lesbian love poems by Pierre Louÿs.

In 1933, following Mammen's inclusion in an exhibition of female artists in Berlin, the Nazi authorities denounced her motifs and subjects as "Jewish", and banned her lithographs for Les Chansons de Bilitis. The Nazis were also opposed to her blatant disregard to for apparent 'appropriate' female submissiveness in her expressions of her subjects. Much of her work also includes imagery of lesbians.  The Nazis shut down most of the journals she had worked for, and she refused to work for those that complied with their cultural policies. Until the end of the war she practiced a kind of "inner emigration". She stopped exhibiting her work and focused on advertising. For a time she also peddled second-hand books from a handcart.

In the 1940s, in a show of solidarity, Mammen began experimenting with Cubism and expressionism, a risky move given the Nazis' condemnation of abstract art as "degenerate". After the war she took to collecting wires, string, and other materials from the streets of bombed-out Berlin to create reliefs. In the late 1940s she began exhibiting her work again, as well as designing sets for the Die Badewanne cabaret. She created abstract collages from various materials, including candy wrappers. In the 1950s she adopted a new style, combining thick layers of oil paint with a few fine marks on the surface.

In the 1970s there was a resurgence of interest in Mammen's early work as German art historians, as well as art historians of the women's movement, rediscovered her paintings and illustrations from the Weimar period. In 2013 her later, more abstract work was featured in "Painting Forever!", a large-scale exhibition held during Berlin Art Week. In 2017–18, the Berlinische Galerie mounted a major exhibition of Mammen's work, titled, "Jeanne Mammen: Die Beobachterin: Retrospektive 1910–1975" (Jeanne Mammen: The Observer: Retrospective 1910–1975), which included more than 170 works in various media, covering the period from the 1920s to her late work in the 1960s and beyond. The show was conceived as an update to a show mounted by the Galerie at the Martin Gropius Bau in 1997, which featured primarily works from the 1920s. In 2010 the Des Moines Art Center exhibited 13 water color paintings done by Mammen which were inspired by Berlin in the Weimer era.

Public collections
Berlinische Galerie
Harvard Art Museums
Des Moines Art Center
Museum of Modern Art
Metropolitan Museum of Art
Morgan Library & Museum

References

Bibliography
Förderverein der Jeanne-Mammen-Stiftung e. V., Jeanne Mammen: Paris  Bruxelles Berlin, Berlinische Galerie Berlin, 2017

Further reading
 
 Lütgens, Annelie. "Jeanne Mammen". In: Louise R. Noun (ed.), Three Berlin Artists of the Weimar Era: Hannah Höch, Käthe Kollwitz, Jeanne Mammen. Des Moines, Iowa: Des Moines Art Center, 1994.

External links
 Official website 

1890 births
1976 deaths
20th-century German painters
20th-century German women artists
20th-century German LGBT people
Artists from Berlin
German illustrators
German lesbian artists
German women painters